Events from the year 1784 in Denmark.

Incumbents
 Monarch – Christian VII
 Prime minister – Ove Høegh-Guldberg, Andreas Peter Bernstorff

Events
 17 September  The Barony of Guldborgland is established by Poul Abraham Lehn from the manors of Orebygård and Berritzgaard.
 26 November  The County of Muckadell is established by Albrecht Christopher Schaffalitzky de Muckadell (1720-1797) from the manors of Arreskov, Brobygård (including Olstedgård) and Gelskov.

Undated

References

 
Years of the 18th century in Denmark
Denmark
Denmark
1780s in Denmark